Purulia Polytechnic, is a government polytechnic in an underdeveloped rural area named Bongabari. This institute stands on a huge area. It was established in 1957. It is one of the oldest polytechnic institutes of India. This polytechnic is affiliated to the West Bengal State Council of Technical Education,  and recognised by AICTE, New Delhi.

Administration

Department 
Purulia Polytechnic is under the West Bengal State Council of Technical Education board and All India Council for Technical Education approved. This institute offers diploma degree in five branches. Semester examination held in January (odd semester) and in June (even semester) every year.

Library

Social Festival 
Purulia Polytechnics organizes a social festival every year named RESONANCE.

Magazine 
The college magazine is named KARIGOR.

Hostel life 

Each hostel has its own cooking staff so that they can provide breakfast, lunch, tiffin and dinner of good quality. Inter-hostel cricket, football, volleyball tournaments are organized by boarders every year. Volleyball playing is a passion for the students. Common room facilities are on the first floor of each hostel. They are furnished with television, music system, carom board.

Transportation 
Bus service is available in front of the campus. Purulia Polytechnic is about 3 kilometers from Purulia railway station, which is 323 kilometers away from Howrah railway station. Purulia railway station is under south-eastern railway. From Howrah railway station Rupasi Bangla Express, Howrah-Chakradharpur passenger is a direct train to Purulia. Another route from Howrah with a break journey at Asansol is preferable and takes less time than the direct route.

Admission procedure 
Aspirants must appear for the JEXPO entrance test. Qualified students can select the institute by attending counseling. In JEXPO entrance test there are three subjects: Physics, Chemistry, Mathematics. ITI trained students can take direct admission to second year.

External links 
 Orkut community of Purulia Polytechnic
 WBSCTE website
 Campus Wikimapia Link
http://www.puruliapolytechnic.in

References

Universities and colleges in Purulia district
Purulia
Educational institutions established in 1957
1957 establishments in West Bengal
Technical universities and colleges in West Bengal